Nieobjeta ziemia ("Unattainable Earth") is a poetry collection, together with prose, aphorisms, letters and fragments, by Nobel Prize-winning Polish writer Czesław Miłosz. It was first published in 1984. It was translated into English by the author and Robert Hass in 1986.

References 

1984 poetry books
1984 non-fiction books
Poetry by Czesław Miłosz
Polish poetry collections
Polish non-fiction books
Collections of letters
Aphorisms